Paddy O'Kane was an Irish soccer player during the 1920s and 1930s.

O'Kane was a tough defender who played for Bohemians during his career in the League of Ireland. He was part of the Bohs team that won the FAI Cup in 1935, beating Dundalk 4–3 at Dalymount Park.
Paddy captained Bohemians in the 1936 season  following his brother Mick who was captain in 1931 to become the 2nd set of brothers to captain the club. The first were the Hooper brothers, Willie and Richard. .

He won full international caps for the Irish Free State while a Bohemian, making his debut against Hungary at Dalymount Park in December 1934.

Honours
FAI Cup:
 Bohemians - 1934/35

References

Republic of Ireland association footballers
Irish Free State international footballers
League of Ireland players
Bohemian F.C. players
Possibly living people
Irish Free State association footballers
Place of birth missing
Association football defenders
Year of birth missing